Newhaven may refer to:

Places
Newhaven, Derbyshire, England, a hamlet
Newhaven, East Sussex, England, a port town
Newhaven, Edinburgh, Scotland 
Newhaven Sanctuary, Northern Territory, Australia
Newhaven, Victoria, Australia

Other uses
Newhaven (horse), the 1896 Melbourne Cup winner
Newhaven College, on Phillip Island, Victoria, Australia
Viscount Newhaven, a title in the Peerage of Scotland
Newhaven, a bombing marking technique used by the Pathfinders
Newhaven F.C., a football club

See also

New Haven (disambiguation)